Kwela is a pennywhistle-based street music from southern Africa with jazzy underpinnings and a distinctive, skiffle-like beat. It evolved from the marabi sound and brought South African music to international prominence in the 1950s.
 
The music has its roots in southern Africa but later adaptations of this and many other African folk idioms have permeated Western music (listen to the albums A Swingin' Safari by the Bert Kaempfert Orchestra (1962) and Graceland by Paul Simon (1986)), giving modern South African music, particularly jazz, much of its distinctive sound and lilting swagger.  The Piranha's 1980 UK Top Ten hit 'Tom Hark' was based on an earlier 1950's Kwela hit song.

One reason for the use of the pennywhistle is that it is cheap and portable, but it also lends itself as a solo or an ensemble instrument. The popularity of the pennywhistle may have been based on the fact that flutes of different kinds have long been traditional instruments among the peoples of the more northerly parts of South Africa and the pennywhistle thus enabled the swift adaptation of folk tunes into the new marabi-influenced music.

Origin

The most common explanation for the word "khwela" is that it is taken from the Zulu for "climb", though in township slang it also referred to police vans, the "khwela-khwela". Thus, it could be an invitation to join the dance, as well as serving as a warning. It is said that the young men who played the pennywhistle on street corners also acted as lookouts to warn those enjoying themselves in the shebeens of the arrival of the police. White people, unaware of its meaning, then thought that it referred to the music when they heard people shouting "Here comes the kwela, kwela!" warning of the police's presence.

Kwela music was influenced by blending the music of Malawian immigrants to South Africa with the local South African sounds. In Chichewa, "khwela" has a similar meaning to the South African one: "to climb". The music was popularised in South Africa and then brought to Malawi, where contemporary Malawian artists have also begun producing khwela music.

Although it has been asserted that khwela music exclusively uses the chord progression I-IV-I-V., others maintain that there is no specific khwela chord progression, or that I-IV-V-I and I-I-IV-V are particularly prevalent.

Artists
Artists such as Lemmy Mabaso were renowned for their pennywhistle skills, and Spokes Mashiyane was one of the most prominent with his kwela pennywhistle tunes.
Other artists include The Skylarks, Jack Lerole, Aaron Lerole, The Solven Whistlers, Kippie Moeketsi, Donald Kachamba and Gwigwi Mrwebe.

References

Further reading
Pennywhistle Kwela: a Musical, Historical and Sociopolitical Analysis. Lara V. Allen, MA (Natal-Durban). 1993.
In Township Tonight! South Africa's Black City Music & Theatre. 2nd edition. David B. Coplan, The University of Chicago Press. 2008. . pp. 190–99.

External links
Kwela at Last.fm
The Kwela Project - website about playing kwela

South African styles of music